The 1917 Presbyterian Blue Hose football team represented Presbyterian College as an independent during the 1917 college football season. Led by the third-year head coach Walter A. Johnson, Presbyterian compiled a record of 8–1. The team captain was D. M. Fulton.

Schedule

References

Presbyterian
Presbyterian Blue Hose football seasons
Presbyterian Blue Hose football